Su Romanzesu is an archaeological site that is located near Bitti, Nuoro Province, Sardinia.

It consists of a Bronze Age nuragic village of more than seven hectares. The site includes a holy well, one hundred huts, two megaron temples, a rectangular temple, an elliptical amphitheater, and a large labyrinth structure.

The name Su Romanzesu derives from the presence of Roman remains. During the 2nd-3rd centuries AD, the area was occupied by the Romans.

Gallery

Bibliography
 A. Taramelli, Foglio 207, Nuoro, in Edizione Archeologica della Carta d'Italia, Firenze, Istituto Geografico Militare, 1931, p. 12, n. 23;
 Ch. Zervos, La civilisation de la Sardaigne, du début de l'énéolithique à la fin de la période nouragique: 2. millenaire, 5. siecle avant notre ere, Paris, Cahiers d'art, 1954, p. 285;
 G. Lilliu, La civiltà dei Sardi dal Paleolitico all'età dei Nuraghi, Torino, Nuova ERI, 1988, p. 534;
 M.A. Fadda, Su Romanzesu: il villaggio e lo stregone, in Archeologia Viva, 69, maggio-giugno 1998, pp. 62–67;
 M.A. Fadda, Nuove acquisizioni del megalitismo nel territorio della provincia di Nuoro, in Aspetti del megalitismo preistorico, Dolianova, Grafica del Parteolla, 2001, pp. 48–66;
 M.A. Fadda, Nuove acquisizioni dell'architettura cultuale della Sardegna nuragica, in Etruria e Sardegna centro-settentrionale tra l'età del bronzo finale e l'arcaismo. Atti del XXI Convegno di Studi Etruschi e Italici (Sassari, Alghero, Oristano, Torralba, 13-17 ottobre 1998), Pisa-Roma, 2002, pp. 311–332.

Archaeological sites in Sardinia